'DAGV is a four-letter initialism which may refer to:
 Deutscher Automaten-Großhandels-Verband E.V., a German trade association and member of EUROMAT
 Diretório Acadêmico Getúlio Vargas the students office  of the well known-Brazilian university Fundação Getúlio Vargas